Docere is a Latin word that means to instruct, teach, or point out. Cicero  first introduced this term in his book De Oratore. Cicero wrote this book in 55 BC as a dialogue to describe the ideal speaker and imagine him as a moral guidance of the state. He suggested that there are three duties or goals of rhetoric. He described these as 'to teach, to delight and to move' (docere/probare, delectare/conciliare, movere/flectere).  Cicero breaks down the term Docere further and summarizes that 'to teach' means to provide truth through rational argument and statement of facts. 
 
"So the whole rhetoric focused on three factors that serve the conviction to prove the truth of what we represent, winning the sympathy of our audience and the influence of his feelings in terms of what the speech subject in each case requires."
 
The "docere" is the mode of action, "which aims at a rational cognitive process and the intellectual abilities of the addressee responds". The production of an intellectual conviction can be done on the basis of rational argument or simply take the form of a statement of facts. In this sense, two forms of "docere" can be distinguished: the message (e.g., enumeration of facts, notice of the speech objective, objective statement of fact or event) and the evidence (e.g. as an argument or complex argument)
 
"Here, the speaker has a twofold evidence, once on the things you can not come up with a speaker that lie rather in the matter and must be treated methodically, such as documents, witness statements, contracts, agreements, awkward interviews, laws, Senate decisions, court judgments, decrees, legal advice and anything else not as found by the speaker, but approached with the case and the accused to him, and the other is that which depends entirely on the representation and reasoning of the speaker. "
- Cicero: About 2,116 speakers

The word "doctor" is derived from the word "docere".

References

Latin words and phrases